The Eighth Census of Bolivia is the national census of Bolivia conducted in 1976.  The population was 4,613,486.

References 

1976 in Bolivia
Censuses in Bolivia
Bolivia